The Wonder List with Bill Weir is a CNN original documentary television series hosted by American journalist Bill Weir.  The series debut was on March 1, 2015 with the first episode on Vanuatu. CNN announced that it had commissioned a second series in shortly after the first series aired. The third season aired on October 7, 2017. The first four episodes of the fourth season was released on CNN+ on April 21, 2022, just hours before it was announced the streaming service would be shut down the following week.

The series entails Bill Weir telling the stories of people, places and cultures at a crossroads.

Episodes

Season 1 (2015)

Season 2 (2016)

Season 3 (2017)

References

External links

CNN original programming
2015 American television series debuts
2017 American television series endings
2022 American television series debuts
2022 American television series endings
2010s American television news shows
2020s American television news shows
2010s American documentary television series
2020s American documentary television series
Television series revived after cancellation